Maks  is a settlement in the administrative district of Gmina Chmielno, within Kartuzy County, Pomeranian Voivodeship, in northern Poland.

Until 2021 routes in Maks were nameless. In August first street with the name was built - Rzemieślnicza street.

For details of the history of the region, see History of Pomerania.

References

Maks